Joy powder is slang that could refer to the following drugs:

 Heroin
 Cocaine
 Marijuana
 Morphine